Scopula deflavarioides is a moth of the family Geometridae. It is found on Borneo. The habitat consists of wet heath forest and hill dipterocarp forest.

The length of the forewings is 8–9 mm. Adults have a yellowish fawn ground colour with a fine, rather wavy fasciation.

References

Moths described in 1997
deflavarioides
Moths of Asia